Vidyananda College ( Vittiyāṉantak Kallūri) is a National school in Mulliyawalai, Sri Lanka. Established in 1951, it was the first school in Mullaitivu District to achieve "college" status.

History
Vidyananda College was founded in 1951 by C. Suntharalingam, the local Member of Parliament. The school was affected by the Sri Lankan Civil War, being located in the eastern Mullaitivu District where battles occurred during the civil war which resulted in the deaths of thousands of civilians. School girls studying in this school were among those killed in the Chencholai bombing.

See also
 List of schools in Northern Province, Sri Lanka

References

External links
 Vidyananda College Old Students Association (UK)

Educational institutions established in 1951
Provincial schools in Sri Lanka
Schools in Mullaitivu District
1951 establishments in Ceylon